Pasur is a panchayat town in the Erode district in the Indian state of Tamil Nadu. Nearby areas include Molasi, Solasiramani and Karumandampalyam

Demographics
 India census, Pasur had a population of 3852. Males constitute 51% of the population and females 49%. Pasur has an average literacy rate of 56%, lower than the national average of 59.5%: male literacy is 65%, and female literacy is 47%. In Pasur, 8% of the population is under 6 years of age.

References 

Cities and towns in Erode district